was a town located in Higashikunisaki District, Ōita Prefecture, Japan.

As of 2003, the town had an estimated population of 5,457 and the density of 74.84 persons per km². The total area was 72.92 km².

On March 31, 2006, Kunimi, along with the towns of Kunisaki (former), Aki and Musashi (all from Higashikunisaki District), was merged to create the city of Kunisaki.

External links
 Kunisaki Official Website 

Dissolved municipalities of Ōita Prefecture